The Isdera Commendatore 112i is a concept car conceived and developed by the German low volume automobile manufacturer Isdera. Introduced at the 1993 Frankfurt Motor Show, the 112i had a compact and sleek aerodynamic body work and was to be a successor to the Imperator 108i but the lack of financial reserves led the company into bankruptcy and only one prototype was completed.

History and development 

After the Imperator 108i had ended production in 1993, Isdera was working on the development of a new model. In 1989, the first clay models took shape and development work was carried out through 1993. The new car called the Commendatore 112i was named in honour of Enzo Ferrari (Ferrari was awarded the title Commendatore II). Commendatore means Knight Commander in Italian language.

The sleek design drew inspiration from the famous Group C race cars. Eberhard Schultz, the company's founder, engaged engineers and technicians from Mercedes-Benz with approval from the company in the development of the car. There were plans to enter the car in LeMans racing which was a reason for the car's elongated styling but the idea never materialised due to Isdera's demise.

The car has handbuilt fibreglass body work on a tubular steel spaceframe chassis and has 18-inch gold BBS alloy wheels fitted with tyres measuring 255/35 ZR18 at the front and 295/35 ZR19 at the rear. The large side intakes help cool the engine. The engine is a 6.0-litre Mercedes-Benz M120 V12 unit (first used in the Mercedes-Benz C112 and later used in the Mercedes-Benz SL600 AMG and the Pagani Zonda S). It was modified to cope with the manual transmission as the original unit only came with an automatic gearbox. The modifications included an in-house developed flywheel and a Bosch ECU.

The 112i retained the periscope rear-view mirror from the Imperator 108i instead of conventional side-view mirrors. It has a flat underbody for improved aerodynamics. The long tail of the car also improved airflow over it. The airbrake raises in an upright position while braking acting as a wind deflector to help slow the car down (similar to a parachute). The car had a drag coefficient of  when tested in the Mercedes-Benz wind tunnel.

The interior of the car was mostly custom made and contained two tone blue and black leather upholstery along with RECARO leather sports seats. The car had wide door sills which housed the two fuel tanks.

Isdera planned a limited production run of the 112i like its predecessor and quoted that each car would take six months to complete. The car was not functional when it was introduced. The development of the car reportedly cost a total of €4,000,000. This combined with the ongoing economic recession in South Asia, particularly the bursting of Japan's bubble economy, pushed the company into bankruptcy shortly after the car's introduction as the major investments came from Japan. The company was then bought by Swiss investors under whom Schultz completed the car in order to make it driveable on the road.

Although officially only one car was completed, Isdera completed a second subframe before its closure which was bought by an enthusiast who also purchased the original body moulds and tooling to build another unit of the 112i in collaboration with Schultz. The project was completed within a span of six years. Schultz withdrew from the project over a dispute on proposed design changes and later a re-emerging Isdera would also deny its existence. The second car is finished in a shade of white called Light Ivory and has a light grey interior with most of the switch gear sourced from Porsche. The design of the exhaust system also differs from the original as the car has a side exit exhaust exiting from beneath the doors.

Later use 

Six years later in 1999, the car was updated and renamed to "Silver Arrow C112i" by a Swiss businessman. On the exterior, the updated car had conventional side-view mirrors and had silver five-spoke Mercedes-Benz alloy wheels instead of the gold BBS units. Interestingly, there was no Isdera badging on the car and it had Mercedes-Benz badging instead. The Silver Arrow was unveiled at the 1999 Frankfurt Motor Show.

The Silver Arrow was bought by Swiss businessman Albert Klöti at a price of €1,500,000. Albert kept the car for 5 years after offering it on eBay for sale for US$3,000,000 in 2005. The car failed to sell after which it was sold back again in 2016 to Isdera. Isdera along with Schultz and the Isdera Classic team then restored the car back to its original form and name and made appearances at motor shows. On 13 February 2021, the Isdera Commendatore 112i was sold at a RM Sotheby's auction in Paris, France for €1,113,125.

Performance 
The Silver Arrow C112i was claimed to have a top speed of  during testing.

Other media 
The Isdera Commendatore 112i was featured in the 1997 Electronic Arts racing video game Need for Speed II. The Silver Arrow C112i was featured in a short documentary on Albert Klöti.

References 

Cars introduced in 1993
Cars introduced in 1999
Commendatore 112i
Rear mid-engine, rear-wheel-drive vehicles
Concept cars
One-off cars